The 2012 French Open (also known as Roland Garros, after the famous French aviator) was a tennis tournament played on outdoor clay courts. It was the 116th edition of the French Open, and took place at the Stade Roland Garros from 27 May until 11 June 2012.

Rafael Nadal won the tournament for the third year in succession, and the seventh time in eight years, defeating first-time Roland Garros finalist Novak Djokovic. His seventh title broke Björn Borg's record of six French Open Men's Singles titles, and equalled Chris Evert's record for most French Open titles won by a man or woman. Li Na was unsuccessful in her title defence, being defeated in the fourth round by Yaroslava Shvedova. Maria Sharapova defeated 21st seed Sara Errani in the final to win her first French Open title, to complete a career Grand Slam, and to return to the World No. 1 ranking for the first time in four years.

This championship was the second time in grand slam history that two multiple slam sets were accomplished in two different disciplines, and that was Mahesh Bhupathi won his first multiple slam in Mixed Doubles, and Esther Vergeer won her second multiple slam set in Women's Wheelchair Doubles. At the 1969 US Open, Rod Laver won his first multiple slam set in Men's Singles, and his fellow countryman Ken Rosewall did in Men's Doubles for the first time. This would occur again for the third time at the 2013 French Open.

Tournament

The 2012 French Open was the one hundred and eleventh edition of the French Open and was held at Stade Roland Garros in Paris. The Men's Singles Final was won by Rafael Nadal by defeating Novak Djokovic in the final. By winning his seventh title at Roland Garros, Nadal surpassed Borg's overall titles record to become the most successful tennis player in French Open history.
The tournament was an event run by the International Tennis Federation (ITF) and is part of the 2012 ATP World Tour and the 2012 WTA Tour calendars under the Grand Slam category. The tournament consisted of both men's and women's singles and doubles draws as well as a mixed doubles event.
There was a singles and doubles events for both boys and girls (players under 18), which is part of the Grade A category of tournaments, and singles and doubles events for men's and women's wheelchair tennis players as part of the NEC tour under the Grand Slam category. The tournament was played on clay courts and took place over a series of twenty courts, including the three main showcourts, Court Philippe Chatrier, Court Suzanne Lenglen and Court 1.

Prize money and ranking points
For 2012, the prize money purse was increased to €18,718,000 from €17,520,000 in 2011. The prize money and points breakdown is as follows:

Points

Seniors

Junior
Below is a table charting the points that are available to the boys and girls in boy singles and doubles play.

Wheelchair

Prize money

* per team

Singles players
Men's singles

Women's singles

Day-by-day summaries

Events

Seniors

Men's singles

 Rafael Nadal defeated  Novak Djokovic 6–4, 6–3, 2–6, 7–5
*It was Nadal's eleventh career Grand Slam title and his 7th title at French Open. It was his 4th title of the year, 50th title overall.

Women's singles

 Maria Sharapova defeated  Sara Errani, 6–3, 6–2
*It was Sharapova's fourth career Grand Slam title and her 1st title at French Open.

Men's doubles

 Max Mirnyi /  Daniel Nestor defeated  Bob Bryan /  Mike Bryan, 6–4, 6–4
*It was Mirnyi's sixth career Grand Slam doubles title and his 4th title at French Open.
*It was Nestor's eighth career Grand Slam doubles title and his 4th title at French Open.

Women's doubles

 Sara Errani /  Roberta Vinci defeated  Maria Kirilenko /  Nadia Petrova, 4–6, 6–4, 6–2
*It was Errani and Vinci's first career Grand Slam doubles title.

Mixed doubles

 Sania Mirza /  Mahesh Bhupathi defeated  Klaudia Jans-Ignacik /  Santiago González, 7–6(7–3), 6–1
*It was Mirza's second career Grand Slam mixed doubles title and her 1st title at French Open.
*It was Bhupathi's eight career Grand Slam mixed doubles title and his 3rd title at French Open.

Juniors

Boys' singles

 Kimmer Coppejans defeated  Filip Peliwo 6–1, 6–4

Girls' singles

 Annika Beck defeated  Anna Karolína Schmiedlová, 3–6, 7–5, 6–3

Boys' doubles

 Andrew Harris /  Nick Kyrgios defeated  Adam Pavlásek /  Václav Šafránek, 6–4, 2–6, [10–7]

Girls' doubles

 Daria Gavrilova /  Irina Khromacheva defeated  Montserrat González /  Beatriz Haddad Maia, 4–6, 6–4, [10–8]

Wheelchair events

Wheelchair men's singles

 Stéphane Houdet defeated  Shingo Kunieda, 6–2, 2–6, 7–6(8–6)

Wheelchair women's singles

 Esther Vergeer defeated  Aniek van Koot, 6–0, 6–0

Wheelchair men's doubles

 Frédéric Cattanéo /  Shingo Kunieda defeated  Michaël Jérémiasz /  Stefan Olsson, 3–6, 7–6(7–3), [10–6]

Wheelchair women's doubles

 Marjolein Buis /  Esther Vergeer defeated  Sabine Ellerbrock /  Yui Kamiji, 6–0, 6–1

Other events

Legends under 45 doubles

 Albert Costa /  Carlos Moyá defeated  Thomas Enqvist /  Todd Woodbridge, 6–2, 6–1

Legends over 45 doubles

 John McEnroe /  Patrick McEnroe defeated  Guy Forget /  Henri Leconte, 7–6(7–5), 6–3

Women's legends doubles

 Lindsay Davenport /  Martina Hingis defeated  Martina Navratilova /  Jana Novotná, 6–4, 6–4

Singles seeds 
The following are the seeded players and notable players who withdrew from the event. Seedings based on ATP and WTA rankings are as of 21 May 2012, Rankings and Points are as of 28 May 2012.

Because the tournament takes place one week later than in 2011, points defending includes results from both the 2011 French Open and tournaments from the week of 6 June 2011 (Halle and London for men; Birmingham and Copenhagen for women).

Men's singles 

The following players would have been seeded, but they withdrew from the tournament.

Women's singles 

The following players would have been seeded, but they withdrew from the tournament.

Main draw wildcard entries

Men's singles
  Brian Baker
  Arnaud Clément
  Jonathan Dasnières de Veigy
  Lleyton Hewitt
  Adrian Mannarino
  Paul-Henri Mathieu
  Éric Prodon
  Guillaume Rufin

Women's singles
  Ashleigh Barty
  Claire Feuerstein
  Caroline Garcia
  Victoria Larrière
  Kristina Mladenovic
  Melanie Oudin
  Irena Pavlovic
  Aravane Rezaï

Men's doubles
  Arnaud Clément /  Kenny de Schepper
  Olivier Charroin /  Stéphane Robert
  Paul-Henri Mathieu /  Florent Serra
  Marc Gicquel /  Édouard Roger-Vasselin
  Adrian Mannarino /  Benoît Paire
  Pierre-Hugues Herbert /  Albano Olivetti
  Jonathan Dasnières de Veigy /  Nicolas Renavand

Women's doubles
  Irena Pavlovic /  Aravane Rezaï
  Alizé Cornet /  Virginie Razzano
  Caroline Garcia /  Mathilde Johansson
  Claire Feuerstein /  Victoria Larrière
  Iryna Brémond /  Sophie Lefèvre
  Séverine Beltrame /  Laura Thorpe
  Julie Coin /  Pauline Parmentier

Mixed doubles
  Mathilde Johansson /  Marc Gicquel
  Stéphanie Foretz Gacon /  Édouard Roger-Vasselin
  Julie Coin /  Nicolas Mahut
  Amandine Hesse /  Michaël Llodra
  Virginie Razzano /  Nicolas Devilder
  Pauline Parmentier /  Benoît Paire

Qualifiers

Men's singles qualifiers

  Jesse Levine
  Eduardo Schwank
  Jürgen Zopp
  Andreas Haider-Maurer
  Filip Krajinović
  Andrey Kuznetsov
  Igor Sijsling
  Horacio Zeballos
  João Sousa
  Florent Serra
  Tommy Haas
  Michael Berrer
  Mischa Zverev
  Daniel Muñoz de la Nava
  Nicolas Devilder
  Rogério Dutra Silva

The following player received entry as a lucky loser:
  David Goffin

Women's singles qualifiers

  Kiki Bertens
  Chan Yung-jan
  Yaroslava Shvedova
  Alexa Glatch
  Heather Watson
  Eva Birnerová
  Dinah Pfizenmaier
  Heidi El Tabakh
  Lauren Davis
  Lara Arruabarrena
  Karolína Plíšková
  Zhang Shuai

The following players received entry as a lucky losers:
  Laura Robson
  Sesil Karatantcheva

Protected ranking
The following players were accepted directly into the main draw using a protected ranking:
 Men's Singles
  Benjamin Becker

Withdrawals
The following players were accepted directly into the main tournament, but withdrew with injuries or personal reasons.

Men's singles
  Pablo Cuevas → replaced by  Blaž Kavčič
  Mardy Fish → replaced by  Frank Dancevic
  Gaël Monfils → replaced by  David Goffin
  Kei Nishikori → replaced by  Karol Beck
  Pere Riba → replaced by  Simone Bolelli
  Robin Söderling → replaced by  Daniel Gimeno Traver 

Women's singles
  Timea Bacsinszky → replaced by  Paula Ormaechea
  Kim Clijsters → replaced by  Mirjana Lučić-Baroni
  Alexandra Dulgheru → replaced by  Nina Bratchikova
  Daniela Hantuchová → replaced by  Laura Pous Tió
  Andrea Petkovic → replaced by  Lesia Tsurenko
  Sílvia Soler Espinosa → replaced by  Laura Robson
  Ágnes Szávay → replaced by  Mathilde Johansson
  Vera Zvonareva → replaced by  Sesil Karatantcheva

References

External links

 Official website